The Battle of Palmdale was the attempted shoot-down of a runaway drone by United States Air Force interceptors in the skies over Southern California in mid-August 1956. The drone was launched from Point Mugu Naval Air Station and soon went out of control. Interceptor aircraft took off from Oxnard Air Force Base and caught up with the drone, but were ultimately unable to bring it down, despite using all of their rockets. After it ran out of fuel, the unmanned aircraft crashed in a sparsely populated tract of desert.

During the incident over 1000 acres were scorched and a substantial amount of property was damaged or destroyed.

Background
In the mid-1950s, the United States Navy was involved in research and development on surface-to-air and air-to-air missiles for the protection of its ships and other assets. The missiles being tested at this time included the AIM-7 Sparrow and the Bendix AAM-N-10 Eagle. Unmanned drones were used to test the missiles' effectiveness. One type of drone was the Grumman F6F-5K Hellcat.

At the same time, one of the air force's major concerns was how to protect the country from Soviet strategic bombers such as the Tupolev Tu-16 and the new Myasishchev M-4. In 1956, the air force's frontline cutting-edge technology interceptor was the heavily armed Northrop F-89D Scorpion. Thirty active duty United States Air Force and seven Air National Guard interceptor squadrons using the Scorpion existed in states from Alaska to New York.

Incident
On the morning of 16 August 1956, at  NAS Point Mugu, an F6F-5K, painted high-visibility red, was prepared for its final mission by Navy personnel. At 11:34 a.m. the drone lifted off the runway and was flown by controllers on a heading to the missile test area above the Pacific Ocean. After a short time the drone stopped responding to commands, and it became clear that the drone had become a runaway.

Controllers watched their target as it started a gentle left-hand climbing curve to the southeast, toward the city of Los Angeles. The Navy had no aircraft available capable of dispatching the drone, so they called Oxnard Air Force Base  to the north. The 437th Fighter-Interceptor Squadron immediately scrambled two F-89D Scorpions. The twin jet-interceptor crews were First Lt. Hans Einstein and his radar observer, First Lt. C. D. Murray, followed by First Lt. Richard Hurliman and First Lt. Walter Hale. The drone turned southwest, crossing over Los Angeles, then headed northwest. As the drone circled slowly over Santa Paula, the Scorpion pilots waited for it to fly over an unpopulated area so they could attack with their "Mighty Mouse" 2.75-inch folding-fin rockets.

The two crews discussed attack options. Their D-model Scorpions were equipped with the new Hughes E-6 fire-control system with AN/APG-40 radar and an attack-plotting computer, which gave them a choice of two attack options to fire the unguided rockets while in automatic mode: from behind in a "tail chase" situation or a firing pass from a 90° "beam" position. Since the drone was almost continuously turning, they chose the second mode of attack. Soon the drone turned northeast, passing over Fillmore, then Frazier Park, heading for the western section of the mostly uninhabited Antelope Valley. The attackers attempted to fire in automatic mode several times, but due to a design flaw in the fire-control system the rockets failed to launch.

Suddenly the drone turned back towards Los Angeles. Einstein and Hurliman were forced to switch from the faulty automatic mode to manual fire. The D-model Scorpions had been delivered with gun sights, but when the E-6 fire-control system was later added, the sights were removed. Now, with the radar-guided system inoperative and no gun sight, the attackers were forced to manually aim the unguided rockets. The F-89D was capable of firing all 104 of its rockets at once, all leaving their tubes in only 0.4 s. The rockets could also be set to "ripple fire" in two different patterns: two ripples (64 and 42 rockets) or three ripples (42, 32, and 30 rockets). A single hit was sufficient to bring down an aircraft. Murray and Hale set their intervalometers to "ripple fire" in three salvos.

While the drone flew over Castaic, the first crew lined up and fired 42 rockets, completely missing their target. The second interceptor moved into position and unleashed another salvo of 42, the rockets passing just beneath the bright red drone, a few glancing off the fuselage underside, but none detonating. Close to the town of Newhall the pair of jets made a second pass, launching a total of 64 rockets; again none found the mark. The two Scorpion crews adjusted their intervalometer settings and, as the wayward drone headed northeast toward Palmdale, each fired a last salvo of 30 at the target with no hits, dispensing their last rockets. In all, the Air Force element fired 208 rockets and were unable to shoot the Hellcat down.

As the Scorpion pilots headed home low on fuel, the drone advanced toward Palmdale, its engine sputtering from fuel starvation. Just before crashing, the drone severed three Southern California Edison electric cables along an unpaved section of Avenue P. The drone's right wing dug into the sand, it then cartwheeled and disintegrated. In July 1997 archeologists found some pieces of the drone "identifiable by part numbers and inspection stamps".

Ground transmitter failure and aircraft receiver malfunction are two possible explanations for the drone going rogue.

Aftermath
The incident resulted in damage on the ground. The Mk. 4 rockets were fitted with point-detonating warheads that armed on firing. Of the 208 rockets, only 15 were discovered undetonated.

Some of the second set of rockets reached the ground near the city of Newhall. In Placerita Canyon, one rocket was seen bouncing along the ground and starting a series of fires near a park, while others set fire to oil sumps owned by the Indian Oil Co. The fires reached within  of the Bermite Powder explosives plant.

The final set of rockets were fired while the Scorpions faced Palmdale; many landed within the town. "As the drone passed over Palmdale's downtown, Mighty Mouse rockets fell like hail." "Edna Carlson, who lived in the home on Third Street East, said that a chunk of shrapnel from one Air Force rocket burst through the front window of her home, ricocheted off the ceiling, went through a wall and came to rest in a kitchen cupboard." More rocket fragments completely penetrated a home and garage on 4th Street East. One rocket landed right in front of a vehicle being driven west on California State Route 138 near Tenth Street West, of which one tire was shredded and many holes were punched through the car's body. Two men in Placerita Canyon had been eating in their utility truck; right after they left it to sit under the shade of a tree, a rocket struck the truck, destroying it. Many fires were started near Santa Clarita, with three large ones and many smaller ones in and around Palmdale.

It took 500 firefighters two days to bring the brushfires under control.  were burned. There were no fatalities.

See also
 Cornfield Bomber

References

Air-to-air combat operations and battles
Palmdale, California
1956 in California
Military history of California
August 1956 events in the United States